Cymatodera hurdi is a species in the family Cleridae ("checkered beetles"), in the order Coleoptera ("beetles").
The distribution range of Cymatodera hurdi includes Central America and North America.

References

Further reading
 Arnett, R.H. Jr., M. C. Thomas, P. E. Skelley and J. H. Frank. (eds.). (2002). American Beetles, Volume II: Polyphaga: Scarabaeoidea through Curculionoidea. CRC Press LLC, Boca Raton, FL.
 Barr, William F. (1972). "New Species of North American Cymatodera (Coleoptera: Cleridae)". Entomologische Arbeiten aus Museum Georg Frey, vol. 23, 1-32.
 Burke, Alan F., John M. Leavengood Jr., and Gregory Zolnerowich (2015). "A checklist of the New World species of Tillinae (Coleoptera: Cleridae), with an illustrated key to genera and new country records".
 Richard E. White. (1983). Peterson Field Guides: Beetles. Houghton Mifflin Company.
 Ross H. Arnett. (2000). American Insects: A Handbook of the Insects of America North of Mexico. CRC Press.

Tillinae
Beetles described in 1972